For the 1960 Vuelta a España, the field consisted of 80 riders; 24 finished the race. The numbers 21 to 30 were reserved for a national team from Portugal, which did not start.

By rider

By nationality

References

1960 Vuelta a España
1960